Yefremovo is the name of several rural localities in Russia.

Yefremovo, Arkhangelsk Oblast, a village in Ukhotsky Selsoviet of Kargopolsky District in Arkhangelsk Oblast
Yefremovo, Lezhnevsky District, Ivanovo Oblast, a village in Lezhnevsky District of Ivanovo Oblast
Yefremovo, Verkhnelandekhovsky District, Ivanovo Oblast, a village in Verkhnelandekhovsky District of Ivanovo Oblast
Yefremovo, Kaluga Oblast, a village in Mosalsky District of Kaluga Oblast
Yefremovo, Moscow Oblast, a village in Pyshlitskoye Rural Settlement of Shatursky District in Moscow Oblast
Yefremovo, Nizhny Novgorod Oblast, a village in Pozdnyakovsky Selsoviet of Navashinsky District in Nizhny Novgorod Oblast
Yefremovo, Chudovsky District, Novgorod Oblast, a village in Gruzinskoye Settlement of Chudovsky District in Novgorod Oblast
Yefremovo, Moshenskoy District, Novgorod Oblast, a village in Dolgovskoye Settlement of Moshenskoy District in Novgorod Oblast
Yefremovo, Oryol Oblast, a village in Topkovsky Selsoviet of Pokrovsky District in Oryol Oblast
Yefremovo, Aristovsky Rural Okrug, Starozhilovsky District, Ryazan Oblast, a village in Aristovsky Rural Okrug of Starozhilovsky District in Ryazan Oblast
Yefremovo, Gulynsky Rural Okrug, Starozhilovsky District, Ryazan Oblast, a village in Gulynsky Rural Okrug of Starozhilovsky District in Ryazan Oblast
Yefremovo, Sakha Republic, a selo in Amgino-Nakharinsky Rural Okrug of Amginsky District in the Sakha Republic
Yefremovo, Gagarinsky District, Smolensk Oblast, a village in Maltsevskoye Rural Settlement of Gagarinsky District in Smolensk Oblast
Yefremovo, Rudnyansky District, Smolensk Oblast, a village in Lyubavichskoye Rural Settlement of Rudnyansky District in Smolensk Oblast
Yefremovo, Kasnyanskoye Rural Settlement, Vyazemsky District, Smolensk Oblast, a village in Kasnyanskoye Rural Settlement of Vyazemsky District in Smolensk Oblast
Yefremovo, Yefremovskoye Rural Settlement, Vyazemsky District, Smolensk Oblast, a village in Yefremovskoye Rural Settlement of Vyazemsky District in Smolensk Oblast
Yefremovo, Penovsky District, Tver Oblast, a village in Runskoye Rural Settlement of Penovsky District in Tver Oblast
Yefremovo, Rameshkovsky District, Tver Oblast, a village in Kiverichi Rural Settlement of Rameshkovsky District in Tver Oblast
Yefremovo, Torzhoksky District, Tver Oblast, a village in Nikolskoye Rural Settlement of Torzhoksky District in Tver Oblast
Yefremovo, Zapadnodvinsky District, Tver Oblast, a village in Zapadnodvinskoye Rural Settlement of Zapadnodvinsky District in Tver Oblast
Yefremovo, Kezsky District, Udmurt Republic, a village in Yuskinsky Selsoviet of Kezsky District in the Udmurt Republic
Yefremovo, Krasnogorsky District, Udmurt Republic, a village in Prokhorovsky Selsoviet of Krasnogorsky District in the Udmurt Republic
Yefremovo, Vladimir Oblast, a village in Kirzhachsky District of Vladimir Oblast
Yefremovo, Uglichsky District, Yaroslavl Oblast, a selo in Klementyevsky Rural Okrug of Uglichsky District in Yaroslavl Oblast
Yefremovo, Bekrenevsky Rural Okrug, Yaroslavsky District, Yaroslavl Oblast, a village in Bekrenevsky Rural Okrug of Yaroslavsky District in Yaroslavl Oblast
Yefremovo, Melenkovsky Rural Okrug, Yaroslavsky District, Yaroslavl Oblast, a village in Melenkovsky Rural Okrug of Yaroslavsky District in Yaroslavl Oblast